Mandvi is a town in the Kachchh district of Gujarat, India.

Mandvi may also refer to:
 Mandvi, Kachchh (Vidhan Sabha constituency), a Gujarat assembly constituency in Kachchh district
 Mandvi, Surat (Vidhan Sabha constituency), a constituency in Surat district
 Mandvi, Mumbai, location in South Mumbai
 Aasif Mandvi, a British-American actor
 Ahmedpur Mandvi Beach

See also
 Mandavi